Soaeb Tai (born 25 December 1989) is an Indian cricketer who plays for Baroda. He made his Twenty20 debut on 3 January 2016 in the 2015–16 Syed Mushtaq Ali Trophy. He made his first-class debut for Baroda in the 2016–17 Ranji Trophy on 5 November 2016. He made his List A debut for Baroda in the 2016–17 Vijay Hazare Trophy on 25 February 2017.

References

External links
 

1989 births
Living people
Indian cricketers
Baroda cricketers
Cricketers from Gujarat